Sabal mauritiiformis (commonly known as the Savannah palm) is a species of palm which is ranges from Mexico (Oaxaca, Chiapas, Campeche, Quintana Roo, Tabasco, Veracruz), Central America, Colombia, Venezuela and Trinidad.

Description
Plants have about 10–25 leaves, each with 90–150 leaflets. The inflorescences, which are branched and longer than the leaves, bear pear-shaped to globose, black fruit.

References

mauritiiformis
Trees of Mexico
Trees of Guatemala
Trees of Honduras
Trees of Colombia
Trees of Belize
Trees of Panama
Trees of Venezuela
Trees of Veracruz
Trees of Quintana Roo
Trees of Campeche
Trees of Chiapas
Trees of Oaxaca
Trees of Trinidad and Tobago
Plants described in 1856